Susan Wilson is a New York Times best selling American author. Her first novel, Beauty, was adapted into a television movie. A later book, One Good Dog, was a New York Times bestseller.

Personal life 
Susan lives on Martha's Vineyard with her husband. She has two grown daughters and three grandchildren. Susan is a horse lover with a Quarter horse mare, Maggie Rose.

Selected works
 Beauty, Scribner, 1997
 Hawke’s Cove, 2000
 Cameo Lake, Pocket Books, 2001
 The Fortune Teller’s Daughter, 2002
 Summer Harbor, 2003
 One Good Dog, St. Martin’s Press, 2010
 The Dog Who Danced, St. Martin’s Press, 2012
 A Man of His Own, St. Martin’s Press, 2013
The Dog Who Saved Me, St. Martin’s Press, 2015
Two Good Dogs, St. Martin’s Press, 2017
The Dog I Loved, St. Martin’s Press, 2019

References

External links
 Susan Wilson’s website

1951 births
American women novelists
20th-century American novelists
20th-century American women writers
21st-century American novelists
21st-century American women writers
Living people